The Khyber Pakhtunkhwa Department of Minerals Development is concerned with Minerals Development in the Pakistan province of Khyber Pakhtunkhwa. It is headed by the Khyber Pakhtunkhwa Minister of Minerals Development, who is a member of the Chief Minister's Cabinet.

Dr. Amjad Ali was appointed as Minister of Minerals Development by Chief Minister of KP Mahmood Khan on August 30, 2018.

History 

The department was created on August 14, 1973. This department's main purpose is to create jobs, promote Minerals Development growth, encourage sustainable development and improve standards of living for all citizens of Khyber Pakhtunkhwa. The department is currently headed by Minister Ziaullah Afridi.

Organization 

The Department is under the control and supervision of a Khyber Pakhtunkhwa Minister of Minerals Development, a political appointee of the Chief Minister of Khyber Pakhtunkhwa. The Minerals Development Minister is assisted in managing the Department by a Secretary of Minerals Development, also appointed by the Chief Minister, who assumes the duties of the Minister in his absence.

Structure 
 Minister of Minerals Development
 Secretary of Minerals Development
 Additional Secretary of Minerals Development
 Deputy Secretary of Minerals Development
 SO Administration
 SO Establishment
 SO Litigation
 Agriculture Analyst
 SO Agriculture

References 

Departments of Government of Khyber Pakhtunkhwa
Ministries established in 1973
1973 establishments in Pakistan
Subnational mining ministries